North Milwaukee Avenue is a street in the city of Chicago and the northern suburbs.

Route description
True to its name, the street, which began as a Native American trail, eventually leads north to the state of Wisconsin and through Kenosha and Racine towards Milwaukee, though not directly. Starting with a short section at N. Canal and W. Lake Streets, it begins in earnest at the corner of N. Des Plaines and W. Kinzie Streets and heads northwest for about  before joining Skokie Highway (U.S. Route 41) in Gurnee, Illinois, which eventually merges at Interstate 94 where Skokie Highway and the Tri-State Tollway split off, continuing to Milwaukee. From Harlem Avenue northwards it is Illinois Route 21.

Milwaukee Avenue is a popular route for bicyclists. The southeastern end of Milwaukee Avenue is the most heavily bicycled stretch of road in Chicago, with cyclists accounting for 22% of all traffic there on a randomly selected day in September.

The street is lined with storefronts, restaurants and the occasional art gallery through most of the city.

The CTA's Blue Line runs beneath or alongside Milwaukee Avenue from its beginning at Canal and Lake Streets out to Logan Boulevard, with stations at Grand Avenue, Chicago Avenue, Division Street, Damen Avenue (in the Wicker Park neighborhood), Western Avenue, California Avenue and Logan Square. The Kennedy Expressway (Interstate 90) roughly parallels Milwaukee Avenue as well.

Just north of Armitage it passes the Chicago Landmark Congress Theater and at Addison Street it passes the Chicago Landmark Schurz High School. Past Irving Park Road it turns more northerly and the Blue Line crosses again at the Jefferson Park station passing the Gateway Theatre. It exits the city at about Albion Avenue and enters Niles, Illinois. (A very brief stretch later reenters the Chicago city limits, located southwest of the intersection of Harlem & Howard avenues; the street is in Niles on either side of this stretch). At Golf Road it passes the Golf Mill Shopping Center. It crosses the Des Plaines River just south of the Chicago Executive Airport. From thence it roughly follows the Des Plaines River north, passing through such communities as Wheeling, Lincolnshire, Vernon Hills, and Libertyville, where it forms the historic core of Libertyville's downtown area. It continues on past Gurnee before merging with the Skokie Highway near Wadsworth.

Wicker Park
Milwaukee Avenue runs through the commercial heart of Chicago's vibrant and trendy Wicker Park and Bucktown neighborhoods.  The Double Door theater and Irazu Costa Rica Restaurant front the avenue in this section.  On an episode of Food Network's Diners, Drive-ins and Dives, host Guy Fieri walks from the Milwaukee Avenue pavement to Irazu's outdoor patio to sample the food for the TV audience.

Sections of the movie High Fidelity were filmed in buildings along Milwaukee Avenue, including the Double Door and the fictional record store that is the nexus of the character's lives.  Although the movie Wicker Park was filmed in Canada, the story is set in this area of Wicker Park, Chicago.  The busy six corner intersection of Damen Avenue, North Avenue, and Milwaukee is the center of the "24 hour" Wicker Park scene with dozens of bars and restaurants, making for popular nightlife. The Flat Iron Arts Center, built in 1913 and designed by Holabird & Roche, is sited at this intersection.

In 2015, the Spike Lee movie Chiraq was being filmed in Chicago, with a scene including rapper actor Nick Cannon filmed at the Double Door on Milwaukee Avenue.

The movie palace Congress Theater, a designed Chicago landmark built in 1926, is located at 2135 N. Milwaukee.

Logan Square

Just northwest of Bucktown, Milwaukee Avenue traverses the heart of Logan Square, Chicago, a gentrifying neighborhood.  Milwaukee Avenue runs on a diagonal through the parkway of the boulevards, Logan Boulevard and Kedzie Avenue at a traffic circle surrounding the Illinois Centennial Monument.

Chicago's Polish Corridor

While Milwaukee Avenue has been a route of chain migration for various ethnicities, it is particularly associated with Chicago's Poles who have dominated vast areas of the city which Milwaukee Avenue cuts through. Numerous Polish Patches dotted the cityscape in its vicinity, from Polish Downtown near Polonia Triangle through the Polish Village in Avondale and the adjacent Villa District which journalist Mike Royko christened as "Polish Kenilworth". The street was once used as part of the route for the Polish Constitution Day Parade as well as Pope John Paul II's 1979 visit to Chicago. Numerous Polish churches, shops, and cultural organizations such as the Copernicus Foundation, the Chopin Theatre, the Society for Arts, and the Polish Daily News still make their home along Milwaukee Avenue, continuing its Polish presence to the present day.

A stretch of Milwaukee Avenue in Niles, Illinois was renamed in honor of Wojciech Seweryn in 2011, the Chicago area artist who died in the plane crash that killed the Polish president and dozens of other Polish leaders in Smolensk, Russia.

Transportation
CTA

56 Millwaukee The 56 Milwaukee runs on the road from Desplaines Street to Jefferson Park Transit Center.

CTA BLUE LINE - The CTA Blue line runs under Millwaukee from Des plaines street to Kimball Avenue in Chicago

PACE 

Pace has multiple routes on Milwaukee Avenue

PACE 270 - The Pace 270 route runs on the road from the Jefferson Park Transit Center to Euclid Ave in Glenview

PACE 272 - The Pace 272 route runs on the road from Golf Mill Station to Townline Road in Vernon hills 

PACE 100 -  This route used Transit Signal Priority (TSP), level boarding and skipped stops to provide express service from Jefferson Park Transit Center to Golf Mill Station. These improvements ended up shaving 9 minutes off of the running time. This brought the running time from 30 minutes to 21 minutes.

Major intersections

Notes

External links
 Milwaukee Avenue Corridor in Glenview

Streets in Chicago
Polish-American culture in Chicago
U.S. Route 45